Marie Louise, Countess d'Aspremont-Lynden (1651 or 1652 – Madrid, 23 October 1692), was a Duchess consort of Lorraine.

Early life 
She was the daughter of Charles II,  Count d’Aspremont, Dun and Baron de Nanteuil (1590-1671) and his wife, Marie Françoise de Mailly (1625-1702).

Marriages and issue 
On 4 November 1665 she was married to Charles IV, Duke of Lorraine, who was 47 years her senior. They had no children.

In 1679, a widow, she married Count Heinrich Franz von Mansfeld, Prince di Fondi, by whom she had two daughters:
 Countess Maria Anna Eleonora von Mansfeld, Princess von Fondi (1680-1724), married firstly to Wilhelm Florentin, Wild und Rheingraf zu Salm (1670-1707); had issue, married secondly to Karl, Count of Colonna von Fels (d. 1713); no issue, married thirdly to Adam Anton Siegfried, Count of Auersperg (1676-1739); had issue.
 Countess Maria Eleonore von Mansfeld (1682-1747), married Prince Carl Franz Anton of Mansfeld-Bornstedt (1678-1717); had issue

References 

1650s births
1692 deaths
Marie Louise